Thirst is a 1959 Soviet drama film directed by Yevgeny Tashkov.

Plot 
The film takes place in Odessa, besieged by the Nazis. They captured the village with the water station and, as result, the residents of Odessa were left without water. A scout named Maria goes behind enemy lines hoping to contact the workers of the water station, but the company does not receive any messages from her and decides to send the sailor Bezborodko, who speaks German very well. The squad goes after him...

Cast 
 Vyacheslav Tikhonov as Oleg Bezborodko leytenant
 Valentina Khmara as Masha (as V. Khmara)
 Yuri Belov as Vasya Rogozin 'Patefon' (as Yu. Byelov)
 Anton Dotsenko as Nikita Nechipaylo (as A. Datsenko)
 Vladimir Ivanov as Tvyordokhlebov (as V. Ivanov)
 Nikolai Timofeyev as Nikitin, polkovnik (as N. Timofeyev)
 Boris Bityukov as Alekseyenko, kapitan-leytenant (as B. Bityukov)
 B. Goduntsov
 Vasili Vekshin as Kalina (as V. Vekshin)
 Mullayan Suyargulov as Mamed (as M. Suyargulov)
 Oleg Golubitsky as Kurt Lemke (as O. Golubitskiy)

References

External links 
 

1959 films
1950s Russian-language films
Soviet drama films
1959 drama films